Richland County is a county in the U.S. state of North Dakota. As of the 2020 census, the population was 16,529. Its county seat is Wahpeton.

Richland County is part of the Wahpeton, ND–MN Micropolitan Statistical Area, which is also included in the Fargo-Wahpeton, ND-MN Combined Statistical Area.

History
The Dakota Territory legislature created the county on January 4, 1873, with area partitioned from Pembina County. It was named for Morgan T. Rich, who settled on the site of the future Wahpeton in 1869. The county organization was completed on November 25 of that same year. Its boundaries were altered in 1883 and 1885. It has maintained its present configuration since 1885.

Geography
Richland County lies at the southeastern corner of North Dakota. Its eastern boundary line abuts the western boundary line of the state of Minnesota (across the Red River), and its southern boundary line abuts the northern boundary line of the state of South Dakota. The Red River flows northerly along its eastern boundary line on its way to the Hudson Bay. The Wild Rice River flows easterly and then northerly through the county, discharging into the Red River north of Richland County, in Cass County. The Sheyenne River flows northeasterly through the NW corner of the county, also discharging into the Red in Cass County.

The Richland County terrain is primarily flat, with rolling hills in the southwest and northwest. It is largely devoted to agriculture. The terrain slopes to the north and east, with its highest point near its SW corner, at 1,220' (372m) ASL.

Major highways

  Interstate 29
  North Dakota Highway 11
  North Dakota Highway 13
  North Dakota Highway 18
  North Dakota Highway 27
  North Dakota Highway 46
  North Dakota Highway 127

Adjacent counties

 Cass County - north
 Clay County, Minnesota - northeast
 Wilkin County, Minnesota - east
 Traverse County, Minnesota - southeast
 Roberts County, South Dakota - south
 Marshall County, South Dakota - southwest
 Sargent County - west
 Ransom County - northwest

National protected area
 Sheyenne National Grassland (part)

Lakes

 Bisek Lake
 Grass Lake
 Gullys Slough
 Kreiser Lake
 Lueck Lake
 Moran Lake
 Park Lake
 Silver Lake
 Stacks Slough
 Swan Lake
 Willows Pond

Demographics

2000 census
As of the 2020 census, there were 17,998 people, 6,885 households, and 4,427 families in the county. The population density was 12.3/sqmi (4.84/km2). There were 7,575 housing units at an average density of 5.28/sqmi (2.04/km2). The racial makeup of the county was 96.83% White, 0.34% Black or African American, 1.66% Native American, 0.24% Asian, 0.03% Pacific Islander, 0.14% from other races, and 0.74% from two or more races. 0.68% of the population were Hispanic or Latino of any race. 46.5% were of German and 26.9% Norwegian ancestry.

There were 6,885 households, out of which 32.4% had children under the age of 18 living with them, 54.2% were married couples living together, 6.5% had a female householder with no husband present, and 35.7% were non-families. 29.4% of all households were made up of individuals, and 11.6% had someone living alone who was 65 years of age or older. The average household size was 2.43 and the average family size was 3.06.

The county population contained 24.7% under the age of 18, 14.5% from 18 to 24, 25.6% from 25 to 44, 20.0% from 45 to 64, and 15.3% who were 65 years of age or older. The median age was 35 years. For every 100 females, there were 107.7 males. For every 100 women age 18 and over, there were 108.6 men.

The median income for a household in the county was $36,098, and the median income for a family was $45,484. Men had a median income of $30,829 versus $20,310 for women. The per capita income for the county was $16,339. About 6.1% of families and 10.4% of the population were below the poverty line, including 7.9% of those under age 18 and 9.6% of those age 65 or over.

2010 census
As of the 2010 census, there were 16,321 people, 6,651 households, and 4,171 families in the county. The racial makeup of the county was 95.0% white, 2.0% American Indian, 0.7% black or African American, 0.5% Asian, 0.1% Pacific islander, 0.4% from other races, and 1.3% from two or more races. Those of Hispanic or Latino origin made up 1.7% of the population. In terms of ancestry, 53.0% were German, 31.2% were Norwegian, 7.0% were Irish, and 2.3% were American.

Of the 6,651 households, 28.3% had children under the age of 18 living with them, 51.6% were married couples living together, 7.1% had a female householder with no husband present, 37.3% were non-families, and 30.9% of all households were made up of individuals. The average household size was 2.31 and the average family size was 2.91. The median age was 39.4 years.

The median income for a household in the county was $47,131 and the median income for a family was $64,636. Males had a median income of $42,597 versus $28,284 for females. The per capita income for the county was $24,342. About 5.2% of families and 10.7% of the population were below the poverty line, including 8.8% of those under age 18 and 11.6% of those age 65 or over.

Communities

Cities

 Abercrombie
 Barney
 Christine
 Colfax
 Dwight
 Fairmount
 Great Bend
 Hankinson
 Lidgerwood
 Mantador
 Mooreton
 Wahpeton (county seat)
 Walcott
 Wyndmere

Unincorporated communities

 Blackmer
 Enloe
 Galchutt
 La Mars
 Lithia
 Tyler

Townships

 Abercrombie
 Antelope
 Barney
 Barrie
 Belford
 Brandenburg
 Brightwood
 Center
 Colfax
 Danton
 Devillo
 Dexter
 Duerr
 Dwight
 Eagle
 Elma
 Fairmount
 Freeman
 Garborg
 Grant
 Greendale
 Helendale
 Homestead
 Ibsen
 LaMars
 Liberty Grove
 Lidgerwood
 Mooreton
 Moran
 Nansen
 Sheyenne
 Summit
 Viking
 Walcott
 Waldo
 West End
 Wyndmere

Politics
Richland County voters have traditionally voted Republican. In only one national election since 1936 has the county selected the Democratic Party candidate (as of 2020).

Education
School districts include:

 Fairmount Public School District 18
 Hankinson Public School District 8
 Kindred Public School District 2
 Lidgerwood Public School District 28
 Richland Public School District 44
 Wahpeton Public School District 37
 Wyndmere Public School District 42

Circle of Nations Wahpeton Indian School is a tribally-controlled school affiliated with the Bureau of Indian Education (BIE).

See also
 National Register of Historic Places listings in Richland County, North Dakota

References

External links
 Richland County, North Dakota
 A history of Richland County and the city of Wahpeton ND (1938?) from the Digital Horizons website
 Richland County maps, Sheet 1 (northern) and Sheet 2 (southern), North Dakota DOT

 
Wahpeton micropolitan area
1873 establishments in Dakota Territory
Populated places established in 1873